The Modder River is a river in South Africa. It is a tributary of the Riet River  that forms part of the border between the Northern Cape and the Free State provinces. The river's banks were the scenes of heavy fighting in the beginning of the Second Boer War at the Battle of Modder River.

There is an inhabited farming place named 'Modder River' just north of the confluence between this river and the Riet.

The Modder River is used extensively for irrigation, including the Krugersdrift Dam near Bloemfontein.

See also
 Battle of Modder River
 List of rivers of South Africa

References

External links

Battle of Modder River, 28 November 1899

Vaal River
Modder River
Karoo
Rivers of the Northern Cape